Carolinian may refer to:
 Something from or related to the Caroline Islands, an archipelago of tiny islands in the Pacific Ocean
 Carolinian language, an Austronesian language spoken in the Northern Mariana Islands in the Pacific Ocean
 Carolinian people, an Austronesian ethnic group which originates from the Caroline Islands
 Something or someone from, or related to, The Carolinas, a region in the United States
 Carolinian forest, a life zone in eastern North America
 Carolinian (train), a daily passenger train operated by Amtrak in the eastern United States
 USS Carolinian (ID-1445), a United States Navy cargo ship in commission from 1918 to 1919
 The Carolinian (play) (also known as The Rattlesnake), a 1922 play by Rafael Sabatini and J. E. Harold Terry.
 The Carolinian (novel), a 1924 novel by Rafael Sabatini based on the 1922 play
 The Carolinian (newspaper), an African-American newspaper from Raleigh, North Carolina
 The Carolinian (student newspaper), a student newspaper from University of North Carolina at Greensboro

See also
 Carolingian (disambiguation)

Language and nationality disambiguation pages